Carlik Anthony Jones (born December 23, 1997) is an American professional basketball player for the Chicago Bulls of the National Basketball Association (NBA). He played college basketball for the Radford Highlanders and the Louisville Cardinals.

Early life and high school career
Jones grew up in Cincinnati, Ohio and attended Aiken High School. He competed alongside Jarron Cumberland in AAU play. He was named third team All-Division IV and first-team all-Cincinnati Metro Athletic Conference after 12.5 points, 5.7 rebounds and 5.1 assists per game as a junior. Jones signed with Radford for college basketball on November 12, 2015. As a senior, Jones averaged 22.3 points and six assists and was named The Cincinnati Enquirer Division IV Player of the Year. He scored 57 points in the sectional final against Hughes STEM High School and led the Falcons to a regional championship and to the State final four.

College career
Jones redshirted his true freshman season. He became a starter for the Highlanders as a redshirt freshman and was named the Big South Conference Freshman of the Year and honorable mention All-Big South after averaging 11.8 points, 3.9 rebounds and 3.1 assists per game. He made a three-pointer with two seconds left against Liberty in the Big South Conference Championship game to send Radford to the NCAA Tournament. He was named first team All-Big South after averaging 15.7 points, 5.2 rebounds and 5.8 assists per game in his redshirt sophomore season. Jones was selected as the Big South Conference Men's Basketball Player of the Year and was again named first team All-Big South as a redshirt junior. He averaged 20 points, 5.1 rebounds, and 5.5 assists per game as a junior. Since Jones was set to graduate from Radford at the end of the 2019–20 school year, he had the option to transfer to another school for his final season of athletic eligibility without having to sit out a year, and chose to become a graduate transfer rather than return to Radford.

Widely considered to be one of the best available graduate transfers in the nation, Jones announced that he had chosen the University of Louisville to play his final season of eligibility. He played in 19 games for the Cardinals. On April 10, 2021, he announced that he would test the NBA Draft waters, allowing him to come back for an additional season due to the COVID-19 pandemic. However, he then made another announcement on April 26, saying that he would sign with an agent and not use the additional year of eligibility at Louisville.

Professional career

Texas Legends (2021)
After going undrafted in the 2021 NBA draft, Jones joined the Dallas Mavericks for the NBA Summer League. On August 21, 2021, he signed with the Mavericks. However, he was waived on October 15. On October 23, he signed with the Texas Legends as an affiliate player. In 10 games, he averaged 20.2 points, 5.4 rebounds and 4.7 assists in 30.8 minutes per game.

Dallas Mavericks (2021)
On December 23, 2021, Jones signed a 10-day contract with the Mavericks. Jones appeared in 3 games for Dallas, averaging 1 rebound and 1.7 assists in 6.4 minutes per game.

Denver Nuggets (2022)
On January 1, 2022, upon the completion of his 10-day contract with Dallas, Jones signed another 10-day contract with the Denver Nuggets.

Return to the Texas Legends (2022)
On January 11, 2022, Jones was reacquired by the Texas Legends.

Windy City Bulls (2022) 
On September 26, 2022, Jones signed with the Chicago Bulls.

On October 23, 2022, Jones joined the Windy City Bulls training camp roster.

Chicago Bulls (2022–present) 
On December 16, 2022, Jones signed a two-way contract with the Chicago Bulls. He was named to the G League's inaugural Next Up Game for the 2022–23 season. On March 3, 2023, Jones' deal was converted to a standard NBA contract by the Bulls.

Career statistics

NBA

Regular season

|-
| style="text-align:left;" rowspan=2| 
| style="text-align:left;"| Dallas
| 3 || 0 || 6.3 || .000 || .000 || 1.000 || 1.0 || 1.7 || .3 || .0 || .7
|-
| style="text-align:left;"| Denver
| 2 || 0 || 2.0 || .500 || — || — || .0 || .0 || .0 || .0 || 1.0
|- class="sortbottom"
| style="text-align:center;" colspan="2"| Career
| 5 || 0 || 4.6 || .111 || .000 || 1.000 || .6 || 1.0 || .2 || .0 || .8

College

|-
| style="text-align:left;"| 2016–17
| style="text-align:left;"| Radford
| style="text-align:center;" colspan="11"|  Redshirt
|-
| style="text-align:left;"| 2017–18
| style="text-align:left;"| Radford
| 36 || 26 || 30.4 || .413 || .305 || .767 || 3.9 || 3.1 || 1.1 || .2 || 11.8
|-
| style="text-align:left;"| 2018–19
| style="text-align:left;"| Radford
| 31 || 30 || 34.2 || .463 || .247 || .758 || 5.2 || 5.8 || 1.7 || .1 || 15.7
|-
| style="text-align:left;"| 2019–20
| style="text-align:left;"| Radford
| 32 || 31 || 33.0 || .488 || .409 || .814 || 5.1 || 5.5 || 1.4 || .2 || 20.0
|-
| style="text-align:left;"| 2020–21
| style="text-align:left;"| Louisville
| 19 || 19 || 37.5 || .402 || .321 || .815 || 4.9 || 4.5 || 1.4 || .1 || 16.8
|- class="sortbottom"
| style="text-align:center;" colspan="2"| Career
| 118 || 106 || 33.2 || .447 || .325 || .790 || 4.7 || 4.7 || 1.4 || .1 || 15.9

References

External links

Louisville Cardinals bio
Radford Highlanders bio

1997 births
Living people
21st-century African-American sportspeople
African-American basketball players
American men's basketball players
Basketball players from Cincinnati
Chicago Bulls players
Dallas Mavericks players
Denver Nuggets players
Louisville Cardinals men's basketball players
Point guards
Radford Highlanders men's basketball players
Texas Legends players
Undrafted National Basketball Association players
Windy City Bulls players